Bedford High School for Girls was a private school for pupils aged 7 to 18 in Bedford, England. It was one of a number of schools run by the Harpur Trust. The school was located on its original site in Harpur ward, near the centre of Bedford, until its closure in 2012. In September 2010 the junior department of the school merged with the junior department of Dame Alice Harpur School. From September 2011 to September 2012 the senior schools also merged, the new school is known as Bedford Girls' School.

History
The school was opened on May 8, 1882. It was built on the site of former Harpur Trust cottage almshouses. Under the early headmistresses Marian Belcher, Kathleen Collier, Emmeline Mary Tanner and Katharine Westaway the school expanded enormously. In 1924 Tanner moved to Roedean School and she was replaced by Westaway who was a classicist.

New school buildings encroached on the nearby houses of Adelaide Square and The Crescent, but never blocking the view of the fine Victorian architecture of the main building from Bromham Road. The original school at first housed both the "High and Modern School for Girls".  Each school had its own half of the building, but by the end of the century the Modern School moved to premises of its own in the centre of the town, and in 1938 to its present site near the river where, from 1946, it became known as Dame Alice Harpur School.

The High School underwent many extensions and additions to its buildings. The Junior School acquired a new wing in 1896, and remained there until moving into a building in Adelaide Square in 1985. In the 1890s the Main Hall was extended out towards the road so that it became T shaped. It also obtained a pipe organ built by Norman and Beard of Norwich which was used for daily assemblies. Other notable changes included the gym built in 1931 which became a theatre, the acquisition of the former Trinity Church which was converted into a dining hall with classrooms above in 1981 and, most recently, in 2005, the new sports and performing arts complex with many facilities including a 25 x 13 m swimming pool.

At first the morning register was called in the hall after assembly, but soon the numbers had exceeded 100 and so registers were taken in the form rooms. By the turn of the century the numbers were above 600, at which level they stabilised until the late seventies when again they grew, reaching around a thousand in the eighties.

Sport in the early years of the school consisted of drill given by a sergeant. The gymnastic dress was made of heavy thick blue serge with a light blue sailor collar. Games only began when an asphalt tennis court was laid down in what became the playground. In 1900 the school acquired the field which is where the girls went to play games. The flourishing of a lively PE department owed much to the vision of PE teacher Stansfeld (BHS 1887-1918). Before its closure, the school had 22 acres (89,000 m²) of games field and a spa centre ('the Canary Cage'), formally opened in 2005 by past pupil Stephanie Cook OBE, (Olympic gold champion and World Champion in the modern pentathlon).

Music, Dance and Drama always played a large part in school life: "Miss Belcher was keen on music, and arranged for five pianos to be placed in a large room, each enclosed in as many glass cases, and just big enough for a pupil and a music teacher. In this way, it was said, the girls would be able to practise in school without disturbing one another!  It probably had more to do with making it possible for one mistress to chaperone the girls with their music masters. Bond-Andrews, the piano teacher, would have none of it: he dragged the first piano out of its glass case, wishing with all his heart for it to be suffocated. Harding was in charge of music for four decades: designing the new organ, and building up a music department with excellent orchestras and choirs. Today there are still those who remember the dreaded Joyce Harding, his daughter, who trained the choirs, and auditioned all junior girls at the beginning of each year. Those who could not sing in tune were labelled "ghosties" and were only allowed to mouth!" This tradition of mouthing continued to the closure of the school. Musical alumnae include the soprano Agnes Nicholls (Lady Hamilton Harty), the clarinetist Dame Thea King, and more recently the soprano Alison Buchanan and cellist Naomi Williams.

Royalty have visited the school on two occasions. King George V and Queen Mary paid a visit in 1918 and they complimented Collie on the way the girls curtsied, and Harding on the way they sang "God Save the King". On another occasion, in 1942, they sang the Yugoslavian national anthem. This was for the visit of Queen Marie of Yugoslavia. A governor was heard to remark afterwards how clever the choir were to learn it in such a short time, and in a foreign language. They had, in fact, been singing the song in English.

From the start in 1882 hymns were sung every day, accompanied by the piano and then, from 1898, on William's organ. Girls always kneeled for prayers, even in the early 1960s when on one occasion a girl in the front row of the gallery knelt down rather quickly, thrusting her head between the vertical wooden railings where it got stuck! A railing had to be sawn through in order to free her. A bible reading, a hymn and a chanted psalm were mandatory until the 1980s when psalm singing went out of fashion. Hymns were still sung regularly, and assemblies were always centred on enforcing the religion of Christianity, or school matters such as the correct way to wear uniform.

Later history
Before closure about ten percent of the girls attending the school were boarders, living in four boarding houses: Wimborne Grange, The Quantocks, Westlands and The Chilterns. Many day girls travelled quite long journeys to the school. Girls studied for GCSEs and A levels as well as the International Baccalaureate. In the last years the school took on a very multicultural character, reflected not just in the English language support given to the international students and the variety of Language A levels taken, but also in the social life: linguistic assemblies and fundraising days in which girls were sponsored for a variety of things, such as speaking all day in a language other than their mother tongue. In the sports department girls frequently competed at county and national levels, and the hockey and lacrosse teams travelled to the Netherlands, Canada, Australia, and Prague. In the music department tuition was offered in all orchestral instruments, keyboard, guitar, piano, recorder, percussion, and singing, and there were choirs and orchestras.

The last school uniform consisted of a traditional Scottish kilt in school tartan, a green or navy blue jumper and a white shirt with a small green eagle representative of the Harpur Trust sewn into the collar.

Merger
In July 2009 the Harpur Trust announced its intention to merge Bedford High School with Dame Alice Harpur School, because the schools had seen a drop in pupil numbers over the years: In 1990 more than 2,000 girls were on the rolls of the two schools, but in 2009 there were only 1,500. In November 2009 it was announced that the new merged school would be called Bedford Girls' School, and would be located on the current site of Dame Alice Harpur School. The junior department of the new school opened in September 2010, when the junior schools of Bedford High and Dame Alice Harper merged on the Cardington Road site. The senior department of Bedford High School started to transfer to the new school in September 2011, with the full merger, including the sixth form department completed in September 2012.

In September 2012, Bedford College leased most of the site of the former Bedford High School for a campus in the north of Bedford town centre. The college later bought the old main school buildings, Trinity Church, and the Sports and Performing Arts (SPA) complex from owners, the Harpur Trust in March 2014.  The college does not occupy the neighbouring accommodation such as former houses in Adelaide Square that were used by the school. The Bedford Sixth Form (which is Bedford College’s branding of its sixth form provision) now occupies the campus and the SPA complex runs under Trinity Arts & Leisure, managed by Bedford College Services Ltd.

Headmistresses
1882-1882  A McDowall (d.1882)
1883-1898  Miss M Belcher (d.1898)
1899-1919  Susan Collie
1920-1924  Miss E Tanner
1924-1949  Miss K Westaway
1949-1965  M Watkins
1965-1976  E Wallen
1976-1987  A Kaye
1987-1994  D Otter (became D Willis)
1994-1995  M Churm
1995-2000  B Stanley
2000-2006 G Piotrowska
2006–2012 J. Eldridge (was J. Pendry)

Exploits of Old Girls in wartime
Headmistress Katharine Westaway wrote a book detailing the activities and difficulties of old girls during World War II. So many of them did work that would have astounded previous generations: she quotes 
 "What do you mean to do when you leave school?"
 "I am joining the A.T.S."
 "What will you do there?"
 "I want to be a gunner."

Many of the girls joined the services: three joined the Air Transport Auxiliary: "These women used to check over the aeroplanes when they left the factories, certify them, and ferry them to the aerodromes from which they were to work, so they needed a theoretical and a practical knowledge of a very high order..."

Some of the girls were resident in the Far East and were subject to the horrors of war: their husbands became prisoners of war of the Japanese, or were killed, or they themselves were interned.

Many of the girls were at home, and even they were subject to bombing, in many cases being bombed out of their houses. They took on new duties in civilian life in support of the war effort; notable were those old girls whose administrative skills were put to work in arranging the evacuation of children, involving encouraging support from sometimes reluctant householders.

Notable former pupils

Dora Carrington, painter and member of the Bloomsbury Group
Gladys Chatterjee, Lady Chatterjee, educator and barrister
Stephanie Cook, pentathlete
Jocasta Innes, author
Sarah Pinborough, author
Thea King, clarinetist
May McKisack, historian
Dora Metcalf, entrepreneur, engineer and mathematician
Agnes Nicholls, operatic soprano
Margaret Partridge (1891–1967), electrical engineer
Rosemary Rapaport, violinist
Ethel Shakespear, geologist

The Other Bedford High School
There is another school of the same name, but that is co-ed, and in Wigan.

References
A History of Bedford High School ed. K.M.Westaway; F.R.Hockliffe(1932)
A History of Bedford High School ed K.M. Westaway; Bedford(1957)
A Century of Challenge: Bedford High School 1882 to 1982;

External links
Official Bedford High School website

Defunct schools in the Borough of Bedford
Girls' schools in Bedfordshire
Educational institutions established in 1882
Educational institutions disestablished in 2012
Boarding schools in Bedfordshire
1882 establishments in England
2012 disestablishments in England
 
Defunct girls' schools in the United Kingdom
Defunct boarding schools in England